Alan Dale (born 1947) is a New Zealand / Australian actor.

Alan Dale may also refer to:

Alan Dale (footballer) (1929–2007), Australian rules footballer
Alan Dale (singer) (1925–2002), American traditional popular and rock 'n' roll singer
Alan Dale (critic) (1861–1928), English theatre critic
Alan Dale, the lead character in Angus Donald's Outlaw Chronicles series of novels
Alan A. Dale, a cargo ship

See also
Alan-a-Dale (disambiguation)
Allendale (disambiguation)